The Filmfare Best Music Director Award is given by the Filmfare magazine as part of its annual Filmfare Awards South for Malayalam films.

Superlatives

Winners

References

External links

Music Director